There are more than 110 current and former churches and other places of worship in the district of Horsham, one of seven local government districts in the English county of West Sussex. The area has a long history of Christian worship, in both the main population centres (Horsham, Billingshurst, Henfield, Pulborough, Steyning and Storrington) and the surrounding villages and hamlets. Many Anglican churches are of Anglo-Saxon or Norman architecture. Roman Catholic places of worship include chapels within convents and priories, including England's only Carthusian monastery, as well as modern churches. Protestant Nonconformity has been well established since the 17th century. Plymouth Brethren are well represented in the north of the district; Baptists, Methodists and United Reformed Church worshippers have many churches; William Penn lived and preached in the area, which still has a strong Quaker presence; and one of eight chapels belonging to a now vanished local sect, the Society of Dependants, still stands at Warnham. There is also a mosque in the town of Horsham.

English Heritage has awarded listed status to nearly 50 current and former church buildings in the district of Horsham. A building is defined as "listed" when it is placed on a statutory register of buildings of "special architectural or historic interest" in accordance with the Planning (Listed Buildings and Conservation Areas) Act 1990. The Department for Culture, Media and Sport, a Government department, is responsible for this; English Heritage, a non-departmental public body, acts as an agency of the department to administer the process and advise the department on relevant issues.  There are three grades of listing status: Grade I, the highest, is defined as being of "exceptional interest"; Grade II* is used for "particularly important buildings of more than special interest"; and Grade II, the lowest, is used for buildings of "special interest". As of February 2001, there were 38 buildings with Grade I status, 60 with Grade II* status and 1,628 with Grade II status in the district of Horsham.

Overview of the district and its places of worship

Much of the land is part of the Weald, some is heavily forested, and large parts are classified as Areas of Outstanding Natural Beauty. More than one-third of residents live in the ancient market town of Horsham, which has grown rapidly since the 19th century to support a population of 45,000. The next largest settlements are the villages of Billingshurst, Henfield, Pulborough, Steyning and Storrington. These and many other villages and hamlets within the 32 civil parishes have ancient churches, particularly from the 13th century. Clockwise from the south, the district is bordered by the districts of Adur, Arun and Chichester in West Sussex; the borough of Waverley and the district of Mole Valley in the county of Surrey; the West Sussex borough of Crawley and district of Mid Sussex; and the city of Brighton and Hove.

The Christianisation of Sussex began with St Wilfrid in the 7th century, and gained pace in the 8th century when St Cuthman arrived at Steyning and founded St Andrew's Church.  The densely forested Weald had been a stronghold of pagan worship, but by the 9th century Sussex was "at least nominally, a Christian county" due to the work of travelling missionaries such as Cuthman, who spent their lives preaching and founding places of worship.

In common with other parts of Sussex, many early churches were simple "two-cell" buildings with a nave and chancel.  As worship became more elaborate, settlements grew larger and building techniques improved, many of these Saxon-era structures were extended or replaced, and Norman or early Gothic architecture characterises many of Horsham district's churches.  Many ancient churches were restored in the Victorian era—sometimes drastically, as at Amberley, Ashington, Billingshurst and Wiston, for example—for several reasons.  New theological and ideological practices within the Anglican church, associated with the Oxford Movement and the Cambridge Camden Society, defined new architectural ideals for churches to follow.  Those that lacked the required features, such as large chancels, chancel screens and a separate nave, were identified for restoration, as were churches with newly unfashionable features such as box pews and galleries.  In other cases, apathy and declining congregations had led to serious structural decay over the course of several centuries.  Meanwhile, population growth in larger settlements necessitated enlargements or rebuildings in some cases.  Gordon Macdonald Hills, who conducted "particularly damaging restorations" at more than 30 Sussex churches, was especially active in the Horsham area, but other architects such as Samuel Sanders Teulon, Henry Woodyer, John Loughborough Pearson, George Gilbert Scott, Jr. and R.H. Carpenter also left their mark on the district's old churches in the 19th century.

Roman Catholic worship in the area has had an unbroken history since before the English Reformation, despite being outlawed for centuries by various Acts of Parliament.  Rich families such as the Wappingthorns at Steyning and the Carylls at West Grinstead maintained the faith, sometimes using secret rooms to celebrate Mass.  Example survives in the Priest's House next to the 19th-century Church of Our Lady of Consolation and St Francis in West Grinstead, and possibly at Henfield.   Mass was sometimes said in private houses (as at Henfield) before permanent churches were built, and three of the district's present Roman Catholic churches are linked to monasteries and convents.  Public worship takes place in the chapels at St Hugh's Charterhouse Monastery at Parkminster and The Towers Convent in Upper Beeding, and the Priory Church of Our Lady of England in Storrington is physically linked to the Premonstratensian monastery there.

Protestant Nonconformist worship has had a long and successful history in the area.  Many denominations founded chapels and meeting places between the 17th and 19th centuries, both in the towns and in rural areas; many survive and remain in use.  Baptist worship never gained such a hold as it did in East Sussex, but Horsham town became a hotbed of the Strict and Particular Baptist cause in the 19th century, when three such chapels were founded: Hope, Rehoboth and Jireh.  General Baptists became established in the 1660s under the leadership of radical evangelist Matthew Caffyn, the first leader of Horsham General Baptist Chapel (1721).  Members of the chapel founded a mission at Billingshurst in 1754; both causes moved towards Unitarianism in the 19th century, and both chapels are still used.  The later Brighton Road General Baptist Church also founded two offshoot chapels.  The Wesleyan and Primitive Methodist movements were also focused on Horsham.  Wesleyan worship at a chapel in the town's London Road dates from 1832.  Outreach work to surrounding villages led to the founding of chapels in Southwater (now demolished), Dragon's Green, Faygate, Mannings Heath and Partridge Green.  The United Reformed Church, into which the Congregational Church merged in 1972, has four congregations in the district; several other chapels fell out of use while still registered as Congregational, and one at Henfield became Evangelical.  The Religious Society of Friends (Quakers) had a presence in towns and villages across the district from the 17th century, despite repression.  William Penn lived at Warminghurst and preached there and at a former meeting house in Steyning, now called Penn's House; he was also linked to the curiously named Blue Idol, a Quaker place of worship since 1691.  Horsham's meeting house dates from 1834, but the community worshipped in houses or in the open air long before that.  Plymouth Brethren, meanwhile, maintain a strong presence in Horsham town.  Their cause was helped by the support of Charles Eversfield of Denne Park, who founded their first meeting house in 1863.  Three other meeting rooms survive in the town.  The Anglican church was strongly opposed to the denomination in the 19th century, seeing it as an "irritant" locally.  Other extant places of worship for Christian Scientists, The Salvation Army and Jehovah's Witnesses exist, and denominations such as Presbyterians, Mormons, Swedenborgians, Pentecostalists and the obscure, localised Society of Dependants  formerly worshipped in the district.  The last named sect, also known as Cokelers, established eight chapels in Sussex and Surrey in the 19th century, often with co-operative shops nearby.  Warnham's old chapel was used until the 1970s, as was the associated shop.

The only non-Christian place of worship in the district is a mosque, which found a permanent home in Horsham town centre only in 2008: the community used houses and industrial buildings previously.  The former Jireh Independent Baptist Chapel, which passed out of religious use in the mid-20th century, became Madina Mosque after Horsham District Council granted planning permission in 2008.

Religious affiliation
According to the United Kingdom Census 2001, 122,088 people lived in Horsham district.  Of these, 76.34% identified themselves as Christian, 0.37% were Muslim, 0.22% were Buddhist, 0.19% were Hindu, 0.18% were Jewish, 0.08% were Sikh, 0.36% followed another religion, 15.44% claimed no religious affiliation and 6.82% did not state their religion.  The proportion of Christians was much higher than the 71.74% in England as a whole, and other religions not listed in the Census were also followed by more people than the national average (0.29%).  The proportion of people with no religious affiliation was also higher than the national figure of 14.59%.  The proportion of Buddhists was slightly lower than the 0.28% national figure; and adherents of Islam, Hinduism, Judaism and Sikhism were much less prevalent in the district than in England overall.  In 2001, 3.1% of people in England were Muslim, 1.11% were Hindu, 0.67% were Sikh and 0.52% were Jewish.

Administration
All Anglican churches in Horsham district are part of the Diocese of Chichester, whose cathedral is at Chichester, and the Archdeaconry of Horsham—one of three subdivisions which make up the next highest level of administration.  In turn, this archdeaconry is divided into eight deaneries.  The churches at Billingshurst, Broadbridge Heath, Colgate, Coolhurst, Itchingfield, Lower Beeding, Mannings Heath, Nuthurst, Partridge Green, Roffey, Rudgwick, Rusper, Shipley, Slinfold, Southwater, Tisman's Common, Warnham and West Grinstead, and the four in Horsham town, are in the Rural Deanery of Horsham.  Those at Amberley, Ashington, Ashurst, Botolphs, Bramber, Buncton, Greatham, Parham, Pulborough, Steyning, Storrington, Sullington, Thakeham, Upper Beeding, Washington, West Chiltington and Wiggonholt are part of the Rural Deanery of Storrington.  Cowfold, Edburton, Henfield and Shermanbury's churches are within the Rural Deanery of Hurst.  Two churches in the southwest of the district—at Coldwaltham and Hardham—are in the Rural Deanery of Petworth.

The Roman Catholic Diocese of Arundel and Brighton, whose cathedral is at Arundel, administers the district's eight Roman Catholic churches.  Those at Billingshurst, Pulborough and Storrington are in Cathedral Deanery; Steyning and Upper Beeding's churches are part of Worthing Deanery; and the churches at Henfield, Horsham and West Grinstead are in the Crawley Deanery.

Three Baptist churches in the district are part of the South Eastern Baptist Association, which administers about 150 churches of that denomination across southeast England.  Brighton Road and Trafalgar Road Baptist Churches in Horsham town are in the Association's Gatwick Network.  Upper Beeding Baptist Church is in the Mid Sussex Network.  Brighton Road Baptist Church in Horsham set up a daughter church in the Littlehaven area of town in 1993.  The Life Community Baptist Church now meets at a school, and is also part of the South Eastern Baptist Association's Gatwick Network.

Current places of worship

Former places of worship

See also
Grade I listed buildings in West Sussex
List of demolished places of worship in West Sussex

Notes

References

Bibliography

Horsham (District)
Horsham (District)
Horsham District